Valfabbrica is a comune (municipality) in the Province of Perugia in the Italian region Umbria, located about 20 km northeast of Perugia.

The municipality of Valfabbrica contains the frazioni (subdivisions, mainly villages and hamlets) Casacastalda, Coccorano, Collemincio, Giomici, Monte Verde, Poggio Morico, and Poggio San Dionisio.

Valfabbrica borders the following municipalities: Assisi, Gualdo Tadino, Gubbio, Nocera Umbra, Perugia.

History

The town developed around the Abbey of Santa Maria in Vado Fabricae, created by the monks of Nonantola. Later it was contended by the communes of Gubbio and Assisi, until it was conquered by the Papal States.

The historical center has remains of the medieval walls and two towers. Notable is also the Romanesque pieve with 14th-century frescoes.

Twin towns
 Greußenheim, Germany
 Venelles, France

Demographic evolution

Sports

From A.S.D. Casacastalda to A.S. Gualdo Casacastalda
Gualdo Casacastalda is an Italian association football club, based in Gualdo Tadino and also in the homonymous frazione of the city.
The club was founded in 2013 after the merger between A.S. Gualdo Calcio and A.S.D. Casacastalda. Its colors are red and yellow.

In the season 2011-12 A.S.D. Casacastalda, founded in 1984, was promoted for the first time, from Eccellenza Umbria to Serie D after playoffs.

References

External links
Thayer's Gazetteer

Cities and towns in Umbria